Alnif is a town in Tinghir Province, Drâa-Tafilalet, Morocco, known for its significant paleontological discoveries. It is located in the southeastern region of Morocco, approximately 180 kilometers east of Ouarzazate, and 1,020 kilometers south of Rabat. According to the 2014 census, the town has a population of 3,770.[1] It lies on the N12 highway, connecting Tinejdad and Taouz.

History 
Alnif has a rich history that dates back to prehistoric times. The town is situated in the region known as the Alnif Basin, which has been the site of numerous paleontological discoveries. Some of the most significant discoveries in the area include fossils of dinosaurs, marine reptiles, and other prehistoric creatures. These discoveries have been instrumental in helping scientists to understand the history of life on Earth.

Geology 
The Alnif Basin is situated within the western portion of the Sahara platform, a large region that extends across North Africa. The basin is composed of sedimentary rocks that were deposited during the Paleozoic and Mesozoic eras. The rocks within the basin have been subjected to significant tectonic activity, resulting in a complex geological history. The basin is particularly known for its fossil-rich deposits, which contain important records of early life on Earth.

Paleontological Discoveries 
Alnif is perhaps best known for its significant paleontological discoveries. The town and its surrounding areas have yielded a large number of fossils, particularly those from the Late Devonian and Early Carboniferous periods. These fossils have included a wide range of prehistoric creatures, including dinosaurs, marine reptiles, and other ancient animals.

Some of the most significant discoveries in the area have been made at the Tizi n'Tagharat Formation, which is located near Alnif. This formation has yielded a large number of well-preserved fossils, including those of early tetrapods, fish, and other creatures. Other notable discoveries in the area have included the fossils of dinosaurs and other reptiles, which have helped to shed light on the evolutionary history of these animals.

Tourism 
In recent years, Alnif has become a popular destination for tourists interested in paleontology. Many visitors come to the town to visit the local fossil shops and to explore the surrounding desert regions. The town hosts an annual festival called the Festival of the Fossil, which celebrates the area's rich paleontological history.

Conclusion 
Alnif is a small town with a rich history and a significant place in the study of paleontology. Its unique geological and paleontological features have made it a popular destination for researchers and tourists alike. As further discoveries are made in the area, the town's importance in the study of prehistoric life is likely to continue to grow.

Notable people 
Abdeslam Ouaddou - Former international footballer

References

Populated places in Tinghir Province